Gbangbégouiné is a town in western Ivory Coast. It is a sub-prefecture of Biankouma Department in Tonkpi Region, Montagnes District.

Gbangbégouiné was a commune until March 2012, when it became one of 1126 communes nationwide that were abolished.

In 2014, the population of the sub-prefecture of Gbangbégouiné was 3,449.

Villages
The five villages of the sub-prefecture of Gbangbégouiné and their population in 2014 are:
 Blégouin (680)
 Ganlé 1 (297)
 Ganlé 2 (1 254)
 Gan-Santa (254)
 Gbangbégouiné (964)

Notes

Sub-prefectures of Tonkpi
Former communes of Ivory Coast